Yasutaka Uchiyama was the defending champion but lost in the first round to Michał Przysiężny.

John Millman won the title after defeating Jordan Thompson 7–5, 6–1 in the final.

Seeds

Draw

Finals

Top half

Bottom half

References
Main Draw
Qualifying Draw

Shimadzu All Japan Indoor Tennis Championships - Singles
2018 Singles